Vidya Sagar Chaudhary (1933/34 – 25 April 2019) was an Indian politician and member of the Bharatiya Janata Party. Chaudhary was a member of the Himachal Pradesh Legislative Assembly from the Kangra constituency in Kangra district.

He died on 25 April 2019 at the age of 85.

References 

1930s births
2019 deaths
People from Kangra district
Bharatiya Janata Party politicians from Himachal Pradesh
21st-century Indian politicians
Year of birth missing
Himachal Pradesh MLAs 1982–1985
Himachal Pradesh MLAs 1990–1992
Himachal Pradesh MLAs 1998–2003